The Rainbow Fairies are a series of fairies that organize the color in Fairyland, in the fictional children's books Rainbow Magic by Daisy Meadows.

Ruby the Red Fairy

Ruby the Red Fairy is the first book in the Rainbow Magic series. In this book, Rachel and Kirsty meet each other on a boat ride to Rainspell Island, and find Ruby in a pot at the end of a rainbow. They find out that something terrible has happened. Ruby tells them before she flutters them off to meet the fairy king and queen.

In the movie, Rainbow Magic: Return to Rainspell Island, she is voiced by Emily Dormer.

To be continued

Amber the Orange Fairy

Amber the Orange Fairy is trapped tight in an unusual place. Can the fluffy feather really help Rachel and Kirsty rescue her? 

In the movie, Rainbow Magic: Return to Rainspell Island, she is voiced by Clarie Morgan.

Saffron the Yellow Fairy

Saffron the Yellow Fairy is stuck in a very sticky situation. Rachel and Kirsty must follow a twisting trail of lemony fairy dust to find her.

In U.S. reprints, she is renamed 'Sunny'. In the movie, Rainbow Magic: Return to Rainspell Island, she is voiced by Lauretta Gavin.

Fern the Green Fairy

Fern the Green Fairy is lost in a leafy hollow. Can Rachel and Kirsty solve the secret of the garden to save her?

In the movie, Rainbow Magic: Return to Rainspell Island, she is voiced by Teresa Gallagher.

Sky the Blue Fairy

Sky the Blue Fairy is having some bubble trouble. Will Rachel and Kirsty be able to help her out, with a clue from the rainbow colored crab?

In the movie, Rainbow Magic: Return to Rainspell Island, she is voiced by Emily Dormer.

Izzy the Indigo Fairy

Izzy the Indigo Fairy is up to her usual mischief. Rachel and Kirsty must fly to the luscious land of sweets, and bring her back to the pot at the end of the rainbow.

In U.S. reprints, she is renamed 'Inky'. In the movie, Rainbow Magic: Return to Rainspell Island, she is voiced by Emily Taaffe.

Heather the Violet Fairy

Heather the Violet Fairy is in a spin. Perhaps the colorful carousel horses can lead Rachel and Kirsty to the final fairy?

In the movie, Rainbow Magic: Return to Rainspell Island, she is voiced by Clarie Morgan.

Characters in the Rainbow Fairies

Main Characters
The main characters are:

- Rachel Walker (in the movie, Rainbow Magic: Return to Rainspell Island, she is voiced by Grace Vance)

- Kirsty Tate (in the movie. Rainbow Magic: Return to Rainspell Island, she is voiced by Lucy Delaiche)

- Ruby

- Amber

- Saffron/Sunny

- Fern

- Sky

- Izzy/Inky

- Heather

Secondary Characters

- Jack Frost (in the movie, "Rainbow Magic: Return to Rainspell Island, he is voiced by David Holt.)

- The Goblins (in the movie, Rainbow Magic: Return to Rainspell Island, the three Goblins shown are voiced by Keith Wickham, Tim Whitnall, and Paul Keating.)

- Bertram

- Fluffy the Squirrel

- Queenie the Bee

- Mrs. Merry

- Queen Titania (in the movie, Rainbow Magic: Return to Rainspell Island, she is voiced by Teresa Gallagher)

- King Oberon (in the movie, Rainbow Magic: Return to Rainspell Island, he is voiced by Tim Whitnall)

- Mr. and Mrs. Tate

- Mr. and Mrs. Walker (in the movie, Rainbow Magic: Return to Rainspell Island, Mrs. Walker is voiced by Teresa Gallagher)

People on Rainspell Island

In the Land of Sweets
These characters only appear in "Izzy the Indigo Fairy".

- Wafer the Elf

- Cone the Elf

- Scoop, the Elves' little brother

- Buttons the Gingerbread Man

- The Sugar Plum Fairy: She lets Izzy, Rachel, and Kirsty use the bubblegum balloon to go to Fairy Land and back to Rainspell Island.

References

 Meadows, Daisy. "Ruby the Red Fairy" Published by Orchard Books
 Meadows, Daisy. "Amber the Orange Fairy" Published by Orchard Books
 Meadows, Daisy. "Saffron the Yellow Fairy" Published by Orchard Books
 Meadows, Daisy. "Fern the Green Fairy" Published by Orchard Books
 Meadows, Daisy. "Sky the Blue Fairy" Published by Orchard Books
 Meadows, Daisy. "Izzy the Indigo Fairy" Published by Orchard Books
 Meadows, Daisy. "Heather the Violet Fairy"'' Published by Orchard Books

External links

 Rainbow Magic

Characters in children's literature
Fairies and sprites in popular culture